Warriors of the Apocalypse is a 2009 science fiction action film directed by Len Kabasinski. It is also known as Apocalypse Female Warriors,. and it unrelated to the 1986 film Warriors of the Apocalypse.

Premise

After World War III reduces the world to an atomic wasteland, four female wastelanders trek to one last remaining city, fighting off mercenaries, zombies, and other dangers along the way.

They are  attempting to survive long enough to make it to the last city, where resources are rumors to be plentiful.

However, the  dictator of that city, Rollins, doesn’t want her city overpopulated so she sends out her team of mercenaries to hunt and eliminate any “survivors” in the wastelands.

The four females, along with the help of a man, Harris, out to avenge the death of his family, fight their way to the city.

Cast

Brian Anthony   .......        Harris

Darian Caine    .......         Luca

Debbie D        .......         Rollins

Pamela Sutch     .......        Spring,

Amara Offhaus    .......        Vick

Renee Porada     .......        Carrie

Brian Arrington

Gary Barickman

Luc Bernier

Matt Borczon

Bob Dobiesz

Home Release

As of June 2020, the movie is available to stream on several platforms.

External links

References

2009 films
2009 science fiction action films
American science fiction action films
2000s English-language films
2000s American films